Kalvola is a former municipality of Finland. Its seat was in Iittala. It was consolidated with Hämeenlinna on 2009-01-01.

It is located in the province of Southern Finland and is part of the Tavastia Proper region. The municipality had a population of 3,449 (2003) and covered an area of 338.81 km2 of which 38.75 km2 is water. The population density was 10.2 inhabitants per km2.
Kalvola is best known for its Iittala glass factory.

The municipality was unilingually Finnish.

A central element of the landscape in Kalvola is lake Vanajavesi near which many of the oldest settlements in the area are concentrated.

NHLer Hannu Toivonen was born here.

External links 

Populated places disestablished in 2009
2009 disestablishments in Finland
Former municipalities of Finland
Hämeenlinna